Le Tronquay is a commune in the Eure department in Normandy in northern France. It is located in the forest of Lyons, 100 km from Paris and 30 km from Rouen. The village has two primary schools. The commune of Le Tronquay includes the localities Les Cornets, La Grand Fray, La Motte, Le Fresnay, and Les Landez, and notable farms are Les Callouettes, Les Brûlins, Le Bâtiment, and La Garenne.

History
Le Tronquay was first mentioned in the 12th century. The name Tronquay is probably related to the word tronc meaning "trunk". In 1787, the commune Les Hogues was separated from the territory of Le Tronquay.

Population

Personalities
 Pierre Guarin, benedictine monk, who published works on Hebrew grammar
 Nicolas Brémontier (1738 in Tronquay - 1809 in Paris)- a general inspector of the départmental routes.  He was the first in France who applied plantations of maritime pines in order to fixate moving sand dunes.

See also
Le Tronquay, Calvados
Communes of the Eure department

References

Communes of Eure